The Ialomicioara is a right tributary of the river Ialomița in Romania. It discharges into the Ialomița at Fieni. The upper reach of the river is also known as Vaca.

References

Rivers of Romania
Rivers of Dâmbovița County